Alfredo Balloni (born 20 September 1989) is an Italian former professional road bicycle racer, who last rode for UCI Continental Team .

Career
Born in Rome, Balloni has competed as a professional since 2010, competing for the  squad for two seasons before joining the  team for the 2012 season. On his Grand Tour début at the 2012 Giro d'Italia, Balloni held the lead of the mountains classification during the race's first leg in Denmark.

Major results

2005
 1st  Road race, National Novice Road Championships
2006
 National Junior Road Championships
1st  Road race
3rd Time trial
2007
 1st  Time trial, National Junior Road Championships
 1st Memorial Maresciallo Sorvillo
 1st Coppa Ocria
 2nd Overall Giro della Toscana
2008
 3rd Overall Coupe des Nations Ville de Saguenay
1st Stage 3
2009
 National Under-23 Road Championships
1st  Time trial
2nd Road race
 1st Trofeo Matteotti Under-23
 2nd GP Città di Felino
 2nd Ruota d'Oro
2013
 5th Tour du Jura
 8th Giro del Medio Brenta

References

External links
 
Farnese Vini-Selle Italia profile

Italian male cyclists
1989 births
Living people
Cyclists from Rome